Mille-Îles (meaning "Thousand Islands") can refer to:

Places
Mille-Îles, provincial electoral district in Laval, Quebec, Canada
Mille-Isles, Quebec, municipality in Quebec
Rivière des Mille Îles, a river channel off Montreal in Quebec, Canada
Rivière-des-Mille-Îles (electoral district), federal electoral district in Quebec, Canada
Thousand Islands (historically), a region and archipelago between Canada and the US on the Saint-Lawrence River, near its source at Lake Ontario

Other uses
Éditions Mille-Îles, a Quebec publisher of comic books
Thousand Islands Bridge, a bridge between Ontario, Canada and New York, US

See also

Thousand Islands (disambiguation), one of several places with this name

Mille (disambiguation)
Ile (disambiguation)